ATM Rozrywka was a Polish television channel owned by ATM Grupa. It was launched on 1 August 2012. This channel was created for the first multiplex of digital terrestrial television in Poland and satelitte Eutelsat Hot Bird 13B. It is owned 100% by Telewizja Polsat.

It was closed on 24 February 2021 due to the concession of broadcasting that wasn’t extended, although the board aims to restart activities as soon as the license issue is resolved.

Schedule 
In network schedule ATM Rozrywka will be comedy sitcoms series, quiz shows  and reality shows.

See also 
 Television in Poland

References 

Defunct television channels in Poland
Television channels and stations established in 2012
Television channels and stations disestablished in 2021